The Roses, registered as The Doomben Roses, is a Brisbane Racing Club Group 3 Thoroughbred horse race for three-year-old filles, run under Set Weights conditions over a distance of 2000 metres at Doomben Racecourse, Brisbane, Australia during the Queensland Winter Racing Carnival.  Total prizemoney is A$175,000.

History
It is currently the main lead-up race for the Queensland Oaks.

The most notable winner of the race is 2001 winner Ethereal, who went on to win that year's Melbourne Cup. In winning the 2002 race, Palidamah set a new race record of 2:01.95 for the 2020 metre distance.

Two fillies have won the Doomben Roses–Queensland Oaks double:
 Ethereal (2001) and Scarlett Lady (2011)

Two trainers have won this race twice:
Roger James (1998, 2006)
Graeme Rogerson (2009, 2011)

Two jockeys have won the race twice:
Greg Childs (2002, 2003)
Darren Beadman  (2006, 2007)

Name
 1996–2009 - Doomben Roses
 2010 onwards - The Roses

Grade
1996–2002 -  Listed Race
2003 onwards - Group 3

Distance

 1996 – 1625 metres
 1997 – 1615 metres
 1998–2011 – 2020 metres 
 2012–2014 – 2000 metres
 2015 – 2020 metres
 2016–2019 – 2000 metres
 2020 – 1800 metres

Venue
 1996–2019 - Doomben Racecourse
 2020 - Eagle Farm Racecourse
 2022 - Eagle Farm Racecourse

Winners

 2022 - Barb Raider
 2021 - Only Words
 2020 - Vanna Girl
 2019 - Etana
 2018 - Youngstar
 2017 - Kenedna
 2016 - Kebede
 2015 - Bohemian Lily
 2014 - Arabian Gold
 2013 - Dear Demi
 2012 - Invest
 2011 - Scarlett Lady
 2010 - Marheta
 2009 - Awesome Planet
 2008 - Heavenly Glow
 2007 - Lasoron
 2006 - Gaze
 2005 - Cinque Cento
 2004 - Natural Woman
 2003 - The Jewel
 2002 - Palidamah                 
 2001 - Ethereal      
 2000 - Avilde                                
 1999 - Episode                            
 1998 - Melora                           
 1997 - Queenstown Kate   
 1996 - Ballare

See also
 List of Australian Group races
 Group races

References

Horse races in Australia
Flat horse races for three-year-old fillies
Sport in Brisbane